The Battle of the Cigno Convoy (or Belluno Convoy''') was a naval engagement between two British destroyers of the Royal Navy and two torpedo boats of the  (Italian Royal Navy) south-east of Marettimo island to the west of Sicily, in the early hours of 16 April 1943. The Italian ships were escorting the transport ship Belluno (4,200 gross register tons) to Tunisia; the torpedo boat , carried aviation fuel. The British force was fought off by the Italian ships for the loss of a torpedo boat. A British destroyer, disabled by Italian gunfire, had to be scuttled after the action when it was clear that it could not make port before dawn.

Background
After Operation Torch, the Allied invasion of French North Africa (8 November 1942), the Allies began a campaign to achieve naval and air supremacy around North Africa and Sicily to interdict the Axis supply route from Italy. In February 1943, the Allied air and sea campaign inflicted a loss of 20 per cent on Axis merchant shipping. In March the rate of loss reached 50 per cent and by April, Axis merchant ship sinkings averaged of 3.3 per day.

The smaller craft were harder to find when sailing dispersed and quicker to unload. A huge extension of minefields planted by both sides had limited the scope for Allied surface ships based at Bône in Algeria to attack Axis shipping to a far greater extent than during the Libyan campaign; Malta-based ships also had little success. Allied aircraft had become a greater threat to Axis sea traffic.

Prelude
On 15 April, the freighter Belluno (4,200 gross register tons) departed Naples for Trapani in Sicily, carrying ammunition for the Axis forces (Army Group Africa [/]) in Tunisia.

A signal arrived from the C-in-C Malta that ships had been sighted off Pantelleria, giving orders to investigate; the ships moved off at 17:45. On 16 April the convoy departed Trapani at 01:00.

The contact was seen to be two torpedo boats in line ahead, on a reciprocal course at  range. The British destroyers turned to starboard to get down moon, silhouetting the Italian ships. Cigno turned towards the shapes, switched on its fighting lights and sent recognition signals. Pakenham also showed fighting lights and turned to starboard towards the Italian ships, as Paladin carried on to the north around the flank of the Italian convoy. Cigno and Pakenham closed quickly and Maccaferri saw that the shapes were British destroyers.

Action

When the range was estimated by Cigno at  it also opened fire and hit Pakenham on the stern with a  100/47 shell, starting a fire and disabling its aft torpedo tubes. As soon as the firing was heard, Belluno and its escorts turned for Trapani. Pakenham received a second hit at 02:50 which exploded in the lower deck and caused a much bigger fire, leading to Stevens ordering the aft magazine to be flooded.

The ships were very close and both fired with every weapon that could be brought to bear, filling the air with multi-coloured tracer ammunition. Pakenham hit Cigno in the forward boiler just to the rear of the bridge at 02:53, releasing a large cloud of smoke and steam over the ship as it came to a stop. While drifting, Cigno fired torpedoes at Pakenham to no effect and Pakenham replied from its undamaged forward torpedo tubes and struck Cigno amidships, breaking the ship in two. The stern quickly sank but the forward section of the ship stayed afloat; its  gun-crew continuing to fire.Pakenham turned north towards Cassiopea but just after 03:00, one or two shells, fired from the forward half of Cigno as it was sinking or from Cassiopea, hit on the waterline cutting the boiler tubes and causing the engine room to flood; the steam forcing the engine-room crew to evacuate. Pakenham listed 15° to port, electrical power was lost and stopped in the water, fires burning. Cassiopea and Paladin had not been hit until Paladin raked Cassiopea with a burst of QF 2-pounder pom-pom fire, which jammed the rudder and started a big fire forward and a smaller one aft.

At 03:08 Paladin doused its lights and ceased fire, which misled the crew of Cassiopea into claiming a hit. Paladin was taking evasive action and broke away to the south-east, after its captain mistook Cassiopea for a Capitani Romani-class cruiser, because Italian shells exploding in the water caused unusually large splashes. Pakenham ceased fire and turned to follow Paladin; Cassiopea was badly damaged, with two large fires onboard and did not pursue.

Aftermath
Analysis
In 2009, Vincent O'Hara wrote that the Battle of the Cigno Convoy was a rare occasion when Italian naval escorts defeated a night attack by British ships. The British thought that they had been engaged by two fleet destroyers and believed that they had sunk them, putting the loss of Pakenham down to an unlucky hit and the lack of experience of both British crews. O'Hara wrote that experience had more influence on the result; the British ships had recently been transferred from the Indian Ocean and Rich deciding to turn away was "unusually cautious". The two Italian crews were veteran and spotted the British ships before the British opened fire but for the Italians to call the engagement a success when one ship was saved for the loss of one escort and another  seriously damaged showed the extent of the British ascendancy in night-fighting.

CasualtiesCigno suffered the loss of 103 crew. Pakenham suffered nine crew killed and fifteen wounded; one of whom died on 18 April.

Subsequent operationsCassiopea was towed back to Trapani by Climene and later to Taranto for repairs. Belluno and Tifone sailed from Trapani at 05:45 and reached Tunis; Tifone unloaded its cargo of aviation fuel at Bizerte. Pakenham and Paladin made for Malta at  but high-pressure steam leaking into Pakenhams engine room made it impossible for the crew to remain. Jones could shut off the steam and wait for the engine room to cool before making repairs but this would take two hours or keep going until the boiler feed-water ran out and the ship stopped in the water. With Axis airfields so close, Jones continued and made another  before losing power, stopping at 03:50. At 06:00, as dawn rose, two aircraft were spotted; the ships dropped the tow as they engaged the Axis aircraft, which were followed by two more, which failed to damage the ships. The tow was resumed at 06:20 but the cable broke after a few minutes; the ships were too far from Malta for Allied fighters to keep a standing patrol over the ships, when they could make only  at best. Orders were received from Malta at 06:30 to sink Pakenham; as a dogfight went on overhead, Jones ordered the destroyer scuttled.

Notes

Footnotes

References

Further reading
 
 
 
 
 

1943 in Italy
April 1943 events
Conflicts in 1943
Italian naval victories in the battle of the Mediterranean
Mediterranean convoys of World War II
Naval battles of World War II involving Italy
Cigno